Copacabana Palace is an Italian comedy film from 1962, directed by Steno, written by Luciano Vincenzoni, starring Walter Chiari, Mylène Demongeot and Franco Fabrizi.

Music 
Antônio Carlos Jobim wrote "Samba do Avião" for this film, where it was performed by Jula De Palma and I 4 + 4 di Nora Orlandi. The movie was filmed in Rio de Janeiro and features cameo appearances by Jobim, João Gilberto and Os Cariocas.

The first performance of the song was by Jobim and Os Cariocas in August 1962 at the Au Bon Gourmet restaurant in Copacabana, Rio de Janeiro, as it featured Jobim, João Gilberto, Vinícius de Moraes and Os Cariocas on stage together for the only time.

Cast 
 Walter Chiari : Ugo
 Mylène Demongeot : Zina von Raunacher
 Franco Fabrizi 
 Sylva Koscina : Ines
 Luiz Bonfá : himself
 João Gilberto : himself
 Antônio Carlos Jobim : himself
 Tonia Carrero : Mrs.Lopez
 Dóris Monteiro : Maria 
 Geórgia Quental

References 

Italian comedy films
1962 films
1962 comedy films
Films directed by Stefano Vanzina
Films with screenplays by Luciano Vincenzoni
1960s Italian films